Eurythecta loxias is a species of moth of the family Tortricidae. It is found in New Zealand.

The wingspan is 13–14 mm. The forewings are whitish ochreous, marbled with pale ferruginous. The hindwings are dark fuscous grey, but somewhat lighter towards base.

References

Moths described in 1888
Archipini
Moths of New Zealand